Michaelston may refer to:

 Michaelston-y-Fedw, a small rural village and community to the west of the city of Newport, Wales, on the border of Cardiff city and Caerphilly county borough
 Michaelston-le-Pit, a village to the west of the city of Cardiff, Wales
 Michaelston-super-Ely, a village, to the west of the city of Cardiff, Wales